John Stevens (5 October 1854 – date of death unknown) was an English cricketer.  Stevens was a right-handed batsman.  He was born at Guildford, Surrey.

Stevens made three first-class appearances for Surrey, playing two matches against Sussex in 1874, and one against Cambridge University in 1875.  In these three matches, he scored a total of 36 runs at an average of 9.00, with a high score of 16.

References

External links
John Stevens at ESPNcricinfo
John Stevens at CricketArchive

1854 births
Year of death unknown
Sportspeople from Guildford
English cricketers
Surrey cricketers